Parasa euchlora is a species of moth in the genus Parasa. It is in the family Limacodidae and the subfamily Limacodinae.

Distribution 
Parasa euchlora occurs in Cameroon, Ghana, Liberia, Nigeria and Togo.

Larval foodplants 
The larval foodplant of Parasa euchlora is Vitex doniana.

References 

Limacodinae
Moths described in 1896
Moths of Sub-Saharan Africa